Wayne Melville "Byrle" Klinck (June 20, 1934 – April 15, 2016) was a Canadian ice hockey player who competed in the 1956 Winter Olympics. Klinck was a member of the Kitchener-Waterloo Dutchmen who won the bronze medal for Canada in ice hockey at the 1956 Winter Olympics.

References

External links

Byrle Klinck's profile at Sports Reference.com
Byrle Klinck's obituary

1934 births
2016 deaths
Olympic ice hockey players of Canada
Olympic medalists in ice hockey
Medalists at the 1956 Winter Olympics
Olympic bronze medalists for Canada
Ice hockey players at the 1956 Winter Olympics